Jack David Harrison (born 20 November 1996) is an English professional footballer who plays as a winger for Premier League club Leeds United. He has also represented England U21.

He was selected as the #1 overall pick in the 2016 MLS SuperDraft and was rated as the second best player in MLS under the age of 24 the same year.

Early life
Harrison was born in Stoke-on-Trent and raised in Bolton, Greater Manchester where he attended Harwood Meadows Primary School and then Turton Secondary School. Harrison spent a short time at the Liverpool academy as a seven-year-old but eventually opted to attend Manchester United's academy, where he spent seven years. At age 14, Jack made the decision to leave the Manchester United academy to attend Berkshire School in Sheffield, Massachusetts, also representing their affiliated club team, Black Rock FC. In 2015, Harrison was the Gatorade National Player of the Year for high-school soccer. Harrison is one of five overseas players to move to the U.S. for high school and win Gatorade National Player of the Year on the men's side, all since 2012.

Harrison signed a National Letter of Intent to play college soccer for Wake Forest University in Winston-Salem, North Carolina. During the 2015 NCAA Division I men's soccer season, he made 22 appearances with Wake Forest, scoring eight goals, and providing 11 assists.

Club career

New York City
In December 2015, reports emerged that New York City were attempting to claim Harrison as a homegrown player because he had played with club youth affiliate Manhattan Soccer Club for the previous three years, allowing them to sign him before the draft. However this claim was rejected by MLS, and Harrison entered the 2016 MLS SuperDraft as the youngest available player. On 14 January 2016, he was selected as the #1 overall pick in the 2016 MLS SuperDraft by Chicago Fire and traded to New York City for the #4 overall pick, Brandon Vincent, plus allocation money. Shortly after the draft it was discovered that Harrison had a fractured pelvic bone which left him on the sidelines for the first three months of his New York City career.

2016 season
Harrison made his professional debut on 21 May 2016 as a 57th-minute substitute for Thomas McNamara in a 0–7 loss against New York Red Bulls at Yankee Stadium. Harrison's individual performance was described as a "silver lining" for his side. Harrison became the first teenage scorer for the club when he scored his first professional goal on his first professional start against Real Salt Lake at Yankee Stadium on 2 June. On 3 July, Harrison scored the opener in the Hudson River Derby in a man of the match performance as New York City recorded their first win over the  Red Bulls. At the end of the season, Harrison was nominated for, but ultimately did not win, the MLS Rookie of the Year Award, which went to Jordan Morris of the Seattle Sounders FC. Harrison was also the runner up for the 2016 MLS Goal of the Year Award, which went to Shkëlzen Gashi of the Colorado Rapids.

2017 season
In March 2017, Harrison and NYCFC teammates Eirik Johansen and Rónald Matarrita earned U.S. green cards. Harrison scored his first goal of the new season on 1 April, in a 2–1 win over San Jose Earthquakes. On 29 April, he recorded his first professional multi-goal performance, scoring a brace to secure a 3–2 victory over Columbus Crew. Harrison also scored the game-winning opener in a 2–0 victory against New York Red Bulls to give the club its first ever win at Red Bull Arena on 24 June. Ahead of his move to Manchester City, Harrison was praised by former teammate Andrea Pirlo, who said of Harrison 'He is very young, he's fast and he is capable of playing in Europe. He's a good player.' and another former teammate Frank Lampard who said 'I think there a lot of big things to come from Jack. I like him, he's a great lad, great ability.'

Manchester City
On 30 January 2018, Harrison signed for Premier League side Manchester City, a partner club with his previous side New York City as part of the City Football Group, signing a contract running until the conclusion of the 2020–21 season. After Harrison's initial loan spell to Leeds United, he returned to Manchester City. Leeds were keen to sign Harrison permanently; however, it was reported that his parent club had put a £20 million valuation on him. On 1 July 2019, Harrison agreed a new one-year contract extension to his contract at Manchester City. On 27 June 2019, it was announced that Harrison was in talks with Leeds United to re-sign on another season long loan deal. City again loaned Harrison to Leeds for a third successive season with a view to make the move permanent the next year.

Middlesbrough (loan)
Immediately after signing a contract with City, Harrison was loaned out to Championship club Middlesbrough, under the management of recently appointed manager Tony Pulis. He made his first appearance for Middlesbrough on 17 February 2018, in the 83rd minute of a 1–0 loss to Cardiff City. He made 4 appearances for Middlesbrough in total, being unable to displace the regular wingers Adama Traoré and Stewart Downing.

Leeds United

2018–19 season 
After taking part in Manchester City's pre-season tour of the United States, on 30 July 2018, Harrison signed for Championship side Leeds United on a season-long loan. He made his debut for Leeds in the opening game of the season on 5 August, as a substitute against his hometown club Stoke City at Elland Road in a 3–1 win. Nine days later, he made his first start in an EFL Cup match against Bolton Wanderers. Harrison made his first start in the League for Leeds on 31 August, coming into the starting lineup for the injured Pablo Hernández in a 0–0 draw against Middlesbrough. On 15 September, he scored his first goal for the club, an 89th-minute equaliser in the 1–1 draw against Millwall.

He scored his second goal of the season on 11 January 2019 against his former New York teammate Frank Lampard's side Derby County in a 2–0 victory. In his 100th professional fixture, Harrison scored the winner in a 1–0 win (his fourth goal for 2018/19) over Sheffield Wednesday at Elland Road, the second game of the season in which he claimed the match-winner.

During the 2018–19 Leeds United F.C. season, Harrison played 42 games in all competitions, scoring four goals. Leeds finished the regular season in third place having dropping out of the automatic promotion places with three games left after a defeat to Wigan Athletic on 19 April, Leeds qualified for the playoffs versus sixth-placed Derby County. Harrison started in both legs and gained an assist for Kemar Roofe's goal as Leeds won the first leg of the playoffs in a 1–0 win at Pride Park, to bring into a 1–0 aggregate lead into the home leg at Elland Road. However, Leeds lost 4–2 in the second leg in an encounter with Leeds down to 10 men after Gaetano Berardi was sent-off, the loss saw Derby progress 4–3 on aggregate to the final against Aston Villa.

2019–20 season 
On 1 July 2019, Harrison re-signed for Leeds United on a season-long loan. As part of the deal Leeds also had the option to sign Harrison on a permanent transfer at the end of the 2019–20 season. He scored on his second debut on 4 August in Leeds' opening day 3–1 victory against Bristol City.

For Harrison's two game-winning goals in November 2019 against Blackburn Rovers and Reading, as well as an additional goal and an assist the same month, he was nominated for the EFL Championship Player of the Month for November, losing out to eventual award-winner, Hull City's Jarrod Bowen. His fifth goal of the 2019–20 season came on 29 December 2019, in a 5–4 win at Birmingham City.  Harrison ultimately helped Leeds gain promotion to the Premier League as EFL Championship champions.

2020–21 season 
On 10 August 2020, it was announced that Harrison would join Leeds for a third successive season on loan, this time with a view to a permanent move, in preparation for the club's return to the Premier League. He scored his first Premier League goal for Leeds, and the club's first goal in the top flight of English football for 16 years, in their first league match of the season against Liverpool. Harrison made his 100th appearance for Leeds in a 1–0 victory against Everton on 28 November 2020 at Goodison Park in Leeds' first win at the opponent club's venue since 1990, and scored his second goal of the season in Leeds' 5–2 home win over Newcastle United on 16 December, a 30-yard top-corner "screamer" that he unleashed from just outside the Newcastle penalty area, having received the ball in his own half. Harrison scored again on 29 December 2020 in Leeds’ 5–0 win over West Bromwich Albion at The Hawthorns. On 15 May 2021, Harrison put in a man of the match performance in a 4–0 away win over Burnley.

2021–22 season
On 2 July 2021, Leeds officially announced the permanent signing of Harrison on a three year contract for a transfer fee of £11 million. He scored his first two goals of the season in a 3–0 victory over Crewe Alexandra in the second round of the EFL Cup on 24 August.

On 16 January 2022, Harrison scored his first senior hat-trick, helping Leeds to a 3–2 victory over West Ham in the league.

On 22 May 2022, Harrison scored a stoppage time winner in a 2–1 win against Brentford at the Brentford Community Stadium, with Leeds staying up in the Premier League as a result of the victory.

International career
On 1 October 2017, Harrison was called into the England U21 squad for the first time after injuries to Ruben Loftus-Cheek and Sheyi Ojo for games against Scotland and Andorra. He made his debut in the fixture against Scotland, replacing Tammy Abraham in the 88th minute. He subsequently made one other appearance for the team.

Style of play
Harrison is a versatile left footed attacker, who plays as a winger, mainly on the left flank, he is also comfortable playing on the right side. He can also play as an attacking midfield playmaker. He is known for his pace, his dribbling ability and workrate. Former New York City teammate David Villa described Harrison, "I've spent a lot of years in this game, and he has something important that only a few players have, when he has the ball at his feet, you get the sensation something special is going to happen."

His former New York City manager Patrick Vieira said of Harrison, "He's a good player, technically he's really good, he understands the game, he can come and link with our No. 9, he can run behind the back four, his football brain is fantastic."

Career statistics

Club

Honours
Leeds United
EFL Championship: 2019–20
Individual
Gatorade Player of the Year: 2015
 NYCFC Player of the Month: June 2016

References

External links
 Profile at the Leeds United F.C. website
 

1996 births
Living people
English footballers
English expatriate footballers
New York City FC players
Manchester City F.C. players
Middlesbrough F.C. players
Major League Soccer first-overall draft picks
Chicago Fire FC draft picks
Wake Forest Demon Deacons men's soccer players
Expatriate soccer players in the United States
Manchester United F.C. players
Association football midfielders
Footballers from Bolton
Footballers from Stoke-on-Trent
English expatriate sportspeople in the United States
Major League Soccer players
All-American men's college soccer players
England under-21 international footballers
Premier League players
English Football League players
Berkshire School alumni